Psalm 104 is the 104th psalm of the Book of Psalms, beginning in English in the King James Version: "Bless the LORD, O my soul. O LORD my God, thou art very great". In Latin, it is known as "Benedic anima mea Domino".

In the slightly different numbering system used in the Greek Septuagint and the Latin Vulgate version of the Bible, this psalm is Psalm 103.

Psalm 104 is used as a regular part of Jewish, Eastern Orthodox, Catholic, Lutheran, Anglican and other Protestant liturgies. It has often been set to music, including works by John Dowland, Heinrich Schütz, Philip Glass and William Lovelady.

Text

Hebrew Bible version 
The following is the Hebrew text of Psalm 104:

King James Version 
 Bless the LORD, O my soul. O LORD my God, thou art very great; thou art clothed with honour and majesty.
 Who coverest thyself with light as with a garment: who stretchest out the heavens like a curtain:
 Who layeth the beams of his chambers in the waters: who maketh the clouds his chariot: who walketh upon the wings of the wind:
 Who maketh his angels spirits; his ministers a flaming fire:
 Who laid the foundations of the earth, that it should not be removed for ever.
 Thou coveredst it with the deep as with a garment: the waters stood above the mountains.
 At thy rebuke they fled; at the voice of thy thunder they hasted away.
 They go up by the mountains; they go down by the valleys unto the place which thou hast founded for them.
 Thou hast set a bound that they may not pass over; that they turn not again to cover the earth.
 He sendeth the springs into the valleys, which run among the hills.
 They give drink to every beast of the field: the wild asses quench their thirst.
 By them shall the fowls of the heaven have their habitation, which sing among the branches.
 He watereth the hills from his chambers: the earth is satisfied with the fruit of thy works.
 He causeth the grass to grow for the cattle, and herb for the service of man: that he may bring forth food out of the earth;
 And wine that maketh glad the heart of man, and oil to make his face to shine, and bread which strengtheneth man's heart.
 The trees of the LORD are full of sap; the cedars of Lebanon, which he hath planted;
 Where the birds make their nests: as for the stork, the fir trees are her house.
 The high hills are a refuge for the wild goats; and the rocks for the conies.
 He appointed the moon for seasons: the sun knoweth his going down.
 Thou makest darkness, and it is night: wherein all the beasts of the forest do creep forth.
 The young lions roar after their prey, and seek their meat from God.
 The sun ariseth, they gather themselves together, and lay them down in their dens.
 Man goeth forth unto his work and to his labour until the evening.
 O LORD, how manifold are thy works! in wisdom hast thou made them all: the earth is full of thy riches.
 So is this great and wide sea, wherein are things creeping innumerable, both small and great beasts.
 There go the ships: there is that leviathan, whom thou hast made to play therein.
 These wait all upon thee; that thou mayest give them their meat in due season.
 That thou givest them they gather: thou openest thine hand, they are filled with good.
 Thou hidest thy face, they are troubled: thou takest away their breath, they die, and return to their dust.
 Thou sendest forth thy spirit, they are created: and thou renewest the face of the earth.
 The glory of the LORD shall endure for ever: the LORD shall rejoice in his works.
 He looketh on the earth, and it trembleth: he toucheth the hills, and they smoke.
 I will sing unto the LORD as long as I live: I will sing praise to my God while I have my being.
 My meditation of him shall be sweet: I will be glad in the LORD.
 Let the sinners be consumed out of the earth, and let the wicked be no more. Bless thou the LORD, O my soul. Praise ye the LORD.

Content
One of the longer psalms, Psalm 104 is traditionally divided into 35 verses. It begins by describing the glory of God ("Who coverest thyself with light as with a garment" v. 2).

 Verse 5 asserts that God has "laid the foundations [] of the Earth".
 Verses 6 to 13 concern the ordering of the waters, verses 14–18 vegetation and animal life, and verses 19–24 the Sun and the Moon, and the cycle of day and night.
 Verse 24 summarises: "O LORD, how manifold are thy works! in wisdom hast thou made them all: the earth is full of thy riches." (KJV)
 Verse 26 mentions the Leviathan (sea monster).
 Verses 27–30 emphasise how all creatures still depend on the ongoing attention and provision of the creator, and perish should he avert his attention. 
 Verse 30 reads "Thou sendest forth thy spirit, they are created: and thou renewest the face of the earth." (KJV)
 The concluding verses (31–35) reiterate the power and glory of YHWH, and the composer expresses his adoration, and, in the final verse, his wish that the sinners and wicked be "consumed out of the earth".

In the Masoretic text, the phrase Hallelujah is placed at the end of the final verse. This is lacking in the Septuagint and the Vulgate, but it is rendered by the KJV as "Praise ye the LORD".

The subject matter and its presentation are closely related both to the first Genesis creation narrative (Genesis 1, chronologically younger than the second version in Genesis 2) where likewise the waters are separated before the creation of Sun and Moon, and to older written accounts of creation from the Ancient Near East, both Mesopotamian and Egyptian. In particular, the Egyptian Great Hymn to the Aten (14th century BC) is frequently cited as a predecessor. Biblical scholar Mark S. Smith has commented that "Despite enduring support for the comparison of the two texts, enthusiasm for even indirect influence has been tempered in recent decades. In some quarters, the argument for any form of influence is simply rejected outright. Still some Egyptologists, such as Jan Assmann and Donald Redford, argue for Egyptian influence on both the Amarna correspondence (especially in EA 147) and on Psalm 104."

Uses

Judaism
Observant Jews recite Psalm 104 in its entirety every day during morning services, and on certain occasions, such as the New Moon (Rosh Chodesh), though customs vary.
Is recited following the Shabbat Mincha between Sukkot and Shabbat Hagadol.
Verses 1–2 are recited upon donning the tallit during morning services.
Verse 24 is part of Hameir La'aretz in the Blessings before the Shema during Shacharit and is found in Pirkei Avot Chapter 6, no. 10.
Verse 31 is the first verse of Yehi Kivod in Pesukei Dezimra, is part of Baruch Hashem L'Olam during Maariv, and is recited when opening the Hakafot on Simchat Torah.

New Testament 
In the New Testament, verse 4 is quoted in Hebrews 1:7.

Eastern Orthodox
Its main liturgical usage in the Eastern Orthodox Church is at the beginning of vespers (evening prayers) and the all-night vigil. While it is technically one of the elements of the vespers service prescribed for the senior reader (that is, the elder or abbot of a monastery, or in a parish the seniormost reader at the kliros), it is customarily read or chanted by a reader after the opening prayers of the service.

The psalm is meant to be read or chanted in a plain style at services of vespers which are not part of a vigil. When vespers is served as part of a vigil, an abbreviated musical version is usually sung by the choir. Several such musical arrangements of the psalm have been composed over the years; perhaps the most familiar is that found in the Obikhod, or common setting.

In the context of its vespers/vigil setting, this psalm is understood to be a hymn of creation, in all the fulness wherein God has created it – it speaks of animals, plants, waters, skies, etc. In the scope of the liturgical act, it is often taken to be Adam's song, sung outside the closed gates of Eden from which he has been expelled (cf. Genesis 3). While the reader chants the psalm, the priest stands outside the closed Royal Doors wearing only his epitrachilion, making this symbolism more evident.

Catholic Church 
This psalm is used during the Easter Vigil on Holy Saturday night (the Vigil being the inauguration of the fifty-day Easter season, the end of Holy Week – and by extension Lent – and the ending of the three-day Easter Triduum of Holy Thursday, Good Friday, and Easter). In the Liturgy of the Word, the first reading is the Creation story of the Book of Genesis, and Psalm 104, which deals with the same material, is the responsorial psalm. It is used again during Pentecost, at the end of the Easter season, as the responsorial psalm for the Vigil and the Sunday Mass.

Popular culture
German philosopher Johann Gottfried Herder remarked, "It is worth studying the Hebrew language for ten years in order to read Psalm 104 in the original".

Musician Bob Marley believed that cannabis use was prevalent in the Bible, reading passages such as the 14th verse of Psalm 104 as showing approval of its usage.

Musical settings
In The Whole Booke of Psalmes, published by Thomas Est in 1592, Psalm 104 is set by John Dowland in English, "My soul praise the Lord". Heinrich Schütz composed a four-part setting to a metric German text, "Herr, dich lob die Seele mein" for the 1628 Becker Psalter, SVW 202. In his 1726 cantata Es wartet alles auf dich, BWV 187, Bach set verses 27 and 28 in the first movement.

Psalm 104, verse 4, was arranged for mixed chorus by Miriam Shatal in 1960.

Psalm 104, in Hebrew, is set as part of Akhnaten, an opera by Philip Glass.

Prince Philip, Duke of Edinburgh, commissioned a setting of Psalm 104 by William Lovelady to mark his 75th birthday. An abridged version of the cantata for four-part choir and organ was performed for his funeral service on 17 April 2021 in St George's Chapel, Windsor.

References

Sources
Nosson Scherman, The Complete Artscroll Siddur, Artscroll Mesorah Series (1985).
Hermann Gunkel, Die Psalmen (1925, 6th ed. 1986), pp. 447ff.; English translation T. M. Horner, The Psalms: a form-critical introduction (1926, reprint 1967).

External links

 
 
 Text of Psalm 104 according to the 1928 Psalter
 Psalms Chapter 104 text in Hebrew and English, mechon-mamre.org
 Bless the LORD, my soul! / LORD, my God, you are great indeed! United States Conference of Catholic Bishops
 Psalm 104:1 introduction and text, biblestudytools.com
 Psalm 104 – LORD of All Creation enduringword.com
 Psalm 104 / Refrain: I will sing to the Lord as long as I live. Church of England
 Psalm 104 at biblegateway.com
 Charles H. Spurgeon: Psalm 104 detailed commentary, archive.spurgeon.org
Tehillim – Psalm 104 (Judaica Press) translation with Rashi's commentary at Chabad.org
 

104
Religious cosmologies